Azygophleps legraini is a moth in the family Cossidae. It is found in Cameroon.

References

Moths described in 2011
Azygophleps